Georgi Plamenov Minchev (born 20 April 1995) is a Bulgarian professional footballer who plays as a forward for Riga.

He started playing with Litex Lovech, signing with CSKA Sofia after three seasons and being loaned to Tsarsko Selo Sofia in early 2017. In June 2018, he moved to the latter club on a permanent deal. After his contract with Tsarsko Selo expired, Minchev joined Lokomotiv Plovdiv in July 2020 on free transfer.

Club career

Litex Lovech
Minchev made his professional debut on 6 November 2013 in a Bulgarian Cup game against Sozopol, coming on as a substitute in the 83rd minute. Litex won the game 2–1. On 11 December, he made his A PFG debut in a 0–0 home draw against CSKA Sofia, coming on in the 1st minute of injury time as a substitute for Wilmar Jordán. Three days later, Minchev scored his first goal during the 5–2 away league win over Lokomotiv Plovdiv.

He became a top goalscorer in the Bulgarian U21 League for 2014–15 season with 18 goals for Litex U21. For the 2015–16 season he was able also for Litex II playing in B Group. He made his debut for the team on 26 July 2015 in a match against Dobrudzha. He scored his debut 2 goals for the team in a match against Spartak Pleven on 24 August 2015.

CSKA Sofia

Tsarsko Selo (loan)
On 17 February 2017, Minchev was loaned to Tsarsko Selo until the end of the season. On 27 May 2017 he scored a hat-trick in the last match of the season against Botev Vratsa. Minchev became captain of the team.

Lokomotiv Plovdiv
Minchev joined Lokomotiv Plovdiv in July 2020.

Riga
Minchev joined Riga in February 2022.

International career
Minchev received his first call up for the Bulgaria national team on 14 May 2021 for the friendly games against Slovakia, Russia and France between 1 June and 8 June. He made his debut on 1 June 2021 against Slovakia.

International goals 
Scores and results list Bulgaria's goal tally first.

|-
!scope=row|
| 9 June 2022 || Victoria Stadium, Gibraltar ||  || align=center | 1–0 || align=center | 1–1 || 2022–23 UEFA Nations League C
|}

Statistics

Honours

Club
Lokomotiv Plovdiv
 Bulgarian Supercup: 2020

References

External links

1995 births
Living people
Association football forwards
Bulgarian footballers
Bulgaria youth international footballers
Bulgaria under-21 international footballers
Bulgaria international footballers
First Professional Football League (Bulgaria) players
PFC Litex Lovech players
PFC CSKA Sofia players
FC Tsarsko Selo Sofia players
PFC Lokomotiv Plovdiv players
Riga FC players
Bulgarian expatriate footballers
Expatriate footballers in Latvia
Bulgarian expatriate sportspeople in Latvia
Sportspeople from Ruse, Bulgaria